Caloneis is a genus of diatoms belonging to the family Naviculaceae.

Species:

Caloneis abnormis 
Caloneis absoluta 
Caloneis achnanthiformis

References

Naviculales
Diatom genera